HDK may refer to:

 HDK (band), Dutch death metal band
 H. D. Kumaraswamy (born 1959), Indian politician
 School of Design and Crafts,, in Gothenburg, Sweden
 Peoples' Democratic Congress, political movement in Turkey